Pontibacter ummariensis  is a Gram-negative bacterium from the genus of Pontibacter which has been isolated from hexachlorocyclohexane contaminated soil in Lucknow in India.

References

External links 

Type strain of Pontibacter ummariensis at BacDive -  the Bacterial Diversity Metadatabase

Cytophagia
Bacteria described in 2016